
Gmina Toszek is an urban-rural gmina (administrative district) in Gliwice County, Silesian Voivodeship, in southern Poland.

Villages
Apart from the town of Toszek, Gmina Toszek contains the villages and settlements of Bliziec, Boguszyce, Brzezina, Ciochowice, Grabina, Grabów, Kopanina, Kotliszowice, Kotulin, Kotulin Mały, Łączki, Las, Laura, Ligota Toszecka, Nakło, Paczyna, Paczynka, Pawłowice, Pisarzowice, Płużniczka, Pniów, Proboszczowice, Sarnów, Skały, Srocza Góra, Szklarnia, Wilkowiczki, Wrzosy and Zalesie.

Neighbouring gminas
Gmina Toszek is bordered by the town of Pyskowice and by the gminas of Bierawa, Rudziniec, Strzelce Opolskie, Ujazd, Wielowieś and Zbrosławice.

References

Toszek
Gliwice County